Jumbo Plastic Linoleum Giants is a basketball team currently playing in the Pilipinas Commercial Basketball League (PCBL). The team debuted during the 2013 Foundation Cup of the PBA D-League.

2013-2015 PBA D-League record
Jumbo Plastic  over the past 5 Conferences have reached the Quarter-Finals; twice and  Semi-Finals, once. Being beaten by defending champion BlackWater Sports.

2015 Pilipinas Commercial Basketball League Foundation Cup

Jumbo Plastic Linoleum Giants won the first ever Pilipinas Commercial Basketball League Foundation Cup December 20, 2015, against the Number 1 Seed Caida TileMaster. They were down as much as 17 points before they rallied and beat Caida; 79-73. Jumbo Plastic was ranked 2nd in this Conference with a W-L record of 6-4.

2015-2016 Back to Back Championship Roster

References

External links

PBA Developmental League teams
Pilipinas Commercial Basketball League